Sheyno is a rural locality (a village) in Korotovskoye Rural Settlement, Cherepovetsky District, Vologda Oblast, Russia. The population was 23 as of 2002. There are 3 streets.

Geography 
Sheyno is located 59 km southwest of Cherepovets (the district's administrative centre) by road. Kokorevo is the nearest rural locality.

References 

Rural localities in Cherepovetsky District